The Estonian Actuarial Society is the association of actuaries in Estonia. The Society was established on 5 January 1999. It is a full member of the International Actuarial Association and the Groupe Consultatif. As of 2004, the Society has 23 members, 7 of them fully qualified.

Chairmen
 2005-2008 Jaanus Sibul
 2008-2011 Marika Guralnik

References

External links
 

Actuarial associations
Organizations based in Estonia